The 2010 Barum Czech Rally Zlín was the ninth round of the 2010 Intercontinental Rally Challenge (IRC) season and also a round of the European Rally Championship. The seventeen stage asphalt rally took place on 27 – 29 August 2010. Other than the opening stage on Friday night all stages were run in daylight.

Introduction
The rally, which was being run for the 40th time, was based in the Moravian town of Zlín. Friday saw the ceremonial start and opening super-special stage running through the streets of Zlín. On Saturday a further eight stages covering  were run on asphalt with the final eight stages being completed on the Sunday. A record-breaking 28 Super 2000 cars started the rally, including six of the top seven drivers in the championship. New entries to the series included Keith Cronin and Niall McShea from the Proton R3 Rally Team.

Results
The early part of the rally was dominated by Kopecký, who won the first, second and third stage and lead the rally at the end of the day.  Day one saw a total of five different drivers take a stage win.   Day two also saw five different stage winners and the overall lead change three times. Kopecký, while in the lead, crashed out of the rally on stage 14 handing the lead to Bouffier only for Loix to take the lead on stage 16 and win the rally.  The result was the fourth 1–2–3 for Škoda in this year's championship.

Overall

Special stages 

Notes:
 – SS14 was cancelled after an accident for Josef Béreš, who was running 23rd on the road. A nominal time of 15:09.0 was given for the drivers who had yet to complete the stage, while times for several other drivers, including Loix and Bouffier stood.

References

External links 
 The official website for the rally
 The official website of the Intercontinental Rally Challenge

Czech
Czech Rally
Barum Rally Zlín